Jesar State was one of the small princely states of British India. It was scattered over a total area of 1.25 sq miles and was one of the  states that formed up the  Sarvaiya  in the former Rewa Kantha Agency. The capital was Jesar.

References

Princely states of Gujarat
States and territories disestablished in 1947
1947 disestablishments in India